Manfred Durniok (2 May 1934 – 7 March 2003) was a German film producer, director and screenwriter. He produced 27 films between 1961 and 2003. He was a member of the jury at the 20th Berlin International Film Festival in 1970.

Selected filmography
 Malatesta (dir. Peter Lilienthal, 1970)
 The Green Bird (1980)

References

External links

1934 births
2003 deaths
Film people from Berlin
Filmmakers who won the Best Foreign Language Film BAFTA Award